The Hanoi Metro is a rapid transit system in Hanoi, the capital city of Vietnam. Owned by the Vietnam Railways and operated by Hanoi Metro Company (HMC), It is the first operational rapid transit system in Vietnam. The first line (Line 2A - Cat Linh Line) opened to service on 6 November 2021.

The system includes elevated and underground sections. Another line (Line 3 - Van Mieu Line)  is under construction, and was expected to commence operations at the end of 2022, however, in September 2022, the authorities requested to extend the deadline to 2025, and increase the budget by a further VND1.9 trillion ($80.77m USD).

Upon opening, daily ridership was at 12,000.

History

Pre-planning
As the capital city of Vietnam, Hanoi's population is growing rapidly. As of 2010 (the year when construction started on the first line), Hanoi's population was around 6,910,000. Hoàn Kiếm District and Ba Đình District are the districts with the highest population density. The government expects the population of Hanoi to increase up to 8,000,000 by 2030. The growing population would affect the city's operation and development. To solve this issue, the Vietnamese government and the Hanoi People's Committee proposed to build an urban rail transit system, which was first proposed in the late 1990s.

In 1998, the Vietnamese government revised and agreed the “Hanoi Capital to 2020 Master Plan” which suggested that Hanoi prioritise the building of a rail transit system, with a target to build 5 lines. The "Overall Plan for the Development of Vietnam's Railway Transportation Industry to 2020", released in 2002, and the "2005-2010 Economic and Social Development Plan for 2006-2010", released in 2006, both suggested the same and aimed to finish the metro system by 2010.

Construction
The start of construction was delayed continually as the government first required the consultant companies from China, France and Japan, such as SYSTRA and Japan International Cooperation Agency, to finish feasibility studies which ran from 2004 to 2007. These three companies suggested the Hanoi government build a network consisting of 6 lines. Finally, in 2008, the Vietnamese government approved the construction of the suggested lines, which they divided into several phases. 

The Phase 1 includes Line 2A and Line 3 construction. The construction of Line 2A was started on 2011, and the construction of Line 3 was started on 2010.

Network
According to the Prime Minister's decision approving the transport development of Hanoi by 2030 and vision to 2050 (519/QD-TTg dated 31 March 2016), the Hanoi Metro system will consist of 8 lines, including elevated and underground sections. The Ministry of Transport (MoT) and the Hanoi People's Committee (HPC) will both be investors in the project. Phase 1 includes Line 2A and Line 3, Line 2A is on the service, and Line 3 is currently under construction.

Line 2A (Cat Linh Line): Cat Linh - Ha Dong 

The  line, consisting of 12 stations (all elevated), and connecting the districts Dong Da, Thanh Xuan and Ha Dong, will be the first operational line in the metro system. This line is constructed using Official Development Assistance (ODA) from China with a total investment of US$868 million. The China Railway Sixth Group is the EPC (Engineering, Procurement and Construction) contractor for the project, and the Ministry of Transport (Vietnam) is an investor.

The construction was started on 10 October 2011 and was initially targeted to begin operations in 2016. In 2016, it was announced that the completion date was to be pushed back to early 2018. However, due to funding and land acquisition issues, construction wasn't completed until September 2018. Following completion, the pilot run and testing was conducted from September to December 2018. Line 2A was scheduled to commence operations in February 2019, before the holidays of Lunar New Year, but was postponed for the sixth time as some station construction works remained incomplete. Transport Minister Nguyen Van The had hopes that operations would begin in April 2019.

On 30 April 2019, a representative from the Railway Project Management Board informed the press that the line was not yet operational, the reason stated being that the system had not yet been issued with a safety certificate and it had not been accepted by the State Acceptance Council. By the deadline of 30 April 2019, the General Chinese Contractor had not completed some stations, depot areas, escalator roofs for stations, drainage connections for Ring Road Station 3, landscaping, trees, electricity and ticketing systems.

After multiple delays, the trial run was restarted on 28 October 2019, to last for 20 days. Beginning in December 2020, Line 2A underwent a full-scale test run in order to check its safety before approval for commercial service. Line 2A opened to the public on 6 Nov 2021.

Line 3 (Van Mieu Line): Nhon - Hanoi Station Section 

The Hanoi Metro Rail System Project (Line 3: Nhon - Hanoi Station section) is in line with the Prime Minister's decision approving the transport development of Hanoi by 2030 and vision to 2050 (519/QD-TTg dated 31 March 2016). The project has the Hanoi Metropolitan Railway Management Board, French government, Asian Development Bank, and European Investment Bank as the investors, and will be built in two phases.

Construction for Line 3 began in 2010 and was initially targeted to commence service in 2018. However, in 2017, it was announced that the construction would not be complete until 2021, and that the operation start was deferred to 2022. In July 2018, the Hanoi Metropolitan Railway Management Board (MRB) announced that only 43% of the work for Line 3 had been completed and that the launch date would most likely be delayed until early 2023. The line was further delayed in September 2022 when the authorities announced that they expected the line to open in 2027.

Future plans

Progress 

Line 1 (Long Biên line - L): Ngọc Hồi - Gia Lâm (Phase I)

The line has the Railway Project Management Unit (RPMU) as its investor and Ministry of Transport as project owner. Its budget is from Japanese ODA. Currently it is in the detailed design phase. 
Furthermore, Ministry of Transportation has reported to National Assembly that the ministry has transferred the railway section from Yên Viên to Ngọc Hồi including Hà Nội railway station and Giáp Bát railway station to Hanoi People's Committee to implement Hanoi urban railway line (AKA Long Biên line) to feed the future North-South High Speed train since there will be a construction of the Northern terminus (AKA the Hà Nội High Speed train station which will be functioned as the new Hà Nội railway station) of North-South High Speed train at Ngọc Hồi on 151 hectares of land.

The line will be completed in 3 phases:
 Phase 1: Ngọc Hồi - Hà Nội railway station - Gia Lâm
 Phase 2: Gia Lâm - Yên Viên  (13.3 km)
 Phase 3: Gia Lâm - Dương Xá (10 km)

Line 2 (Hoan Kiem line - H): Noi Bai Airport - Nam Thang Long - Tran Hung Dao - Thuong Dinh - Hoang Quoc Viet

This section is 42 km in length, connecting Noi Bai Airport with the city center. There will be 32 stations and 2 depots. The 4 phases of the project are:
 Phase 1: Nam Thang Long - Tran Hung Dao: 11.5 km long, of which 8.9 km underground and 2.6 km on surface. It consists of 10 stations including 7 underground, 3 elevated and 1 depot. The project owner is Hanoi Metropolitan Railway Management Board. The project will be funded by Japanese ODA. At present cost estimate is pending to be approved.
 Phase 2: Tran Hung Dao - Thuong Dinh: 5.9 km long, totally underground and now is at feasibility study phase.
 Phase 3: Thuong Dinh - Ring road 2.5 - Hoang Quoc Viet
 Phase 4: Noi Bai Airport - Nam Thang Long: 12.5 km long

Line 4 (Thang Long line - T): Me Linh - Dong Anh - Hoang Mai - Ring road 2.5 - Co Nhue - Lien Ha

Metro line 4 is the longest out of 8 lines, with 41 stations and 2 depots. It will work as a loop line that takes into account connections with lines 1, 2A, 3, 5, 6 and 7.

Line 5 (Kim Ma line - K): South West Lake - Hoa Lac - Ba Vi

In 2012, the project was expected to start in 2017 but the commencement date has now been postponed. It will be 38.4 km long with 17 stations and 2 depots. Right now feasibility study is carried out by the Japan International Cooperation Agency (JICA). Its project owner is the Hanoi Metropolitan Railway Management Board. 2 phases are:
 Phase 1: South West Lake - An Khanh: 14.1 km with 10 stations
 Phase 2: An Khanh - Ba Vi: 24.1 km with 7 stations

Line 6 (Noi Bai line - N): Noi Bai Airport - Phu Dien - Ha Dong - Ngoc Hoi

The route runs mainly on the current national track system, connecting the southern districts to the northern ones and Noi Bai airport (T2 terminal).

Line 7 (Ha Dong line - A): Me Linh - Nhon - Van Canh - Duong Noi

Metro line 7 is 27.6 km long with 23 stations and 1 depot at Me Linh. The route runs in the north to the south, connecting Me Linh urban area to urban area series in the midst of ring roads 3 and 4 and downtown in the west of Hanoi.

Line 8 (My Dinh line - M): Son Dong - Mai Dich - Linh Nam - Duong Xa

The underground section is from Mai Dich to Linh Nam, and elevated sections are 2 parts: Son Dong to Mai Dich and Linh Nam to Duong Xa.

Rolling stock

Line 2A: CRRC trains 

On 20 October 2015, the Railway Project Management Unit (RPMU) organized the Cat Linh - Ha Dong sample train exhibition at Giang Vo Exhibition Center, Ba Dinh District. The decision was made to use Chinese rolling stock manufacturer CRRC Corporation Limited (CRRC) trains, made by Beijing Subway Rolling Stock Equipment, to supply the rolling stock for Line 2A.

Each train will consist of 4 carriages, with capacity for over 1,200 passengers. The first train arrived in Hanoi in March 2017 via the port of Hai Phong. The CRRC supplied a total of 13 four-car train-sets in 2018, which are all currently stabled at a depot at Phu Luong, east of Yen Nghia. Trains are powered by a 750 V third rail, a first for Vietnam.

The trains' exteriors are painted green, and the seal of the Hanoi Temple of Literature, which is the symbol Khue Van of Hanoi, is shown on the front of the train, and the line name “Cat Linh - Ha Dong” is displayed along the bottom in white. A small LED screen is place at the left top corner to show the name of the line.

Line 3: Alstom trains

On 17 January 2017, Hanoi Metro Company signed a contract with French locomotive manufacturer Alstom to supply the rolling stock for Line 3, which will come from its Alstom Metropolis series. The current order is for 10 train sets, costing around US$128 million. The trains features an air-conditioning system, speakers, automatic LED lights. The interior is wheelchair accessible, and also includes dedicated space and seating for senior citizens. Each train can carry 950 passengers. First four-car trains were shipped from the port of Dunkirk, on 9 September 2020.

The cyan, pink and grey of the exterior design symbolises rice seeding leaves and dragon fruit, some of the main products in Vietnam. Additionally, like Line 2A, the seal of the Hanoi Temple of Literature is displayed on the front of the train.

Fares and ticketing 
The ticket system will allow for connection between all routes and will be usable with other public transportation such as bus, taxi, etc. The tickets will be available for purchase at the terminal (ticket office or vending machine), using a modern, compact form of ticket (similar to an ATM card). Tickets will use modern technology, with value retention and high security.

There will be many types of tickets for passengers to choose from: Tickets take turns, Ticket by day, week, month, Group ticket and Electronic ticket (IC Card) combines many other gadgets.

Line 2A Fares and ticketing 
The price of the tickets for the Cat Linh-Ha Dong metro, with the lowest one being VND 8,000 (USD 0.35) for a short trip, VND 15,000 (USD 0.66) for a longest trip, and VND 30,000 (USD 1.32) for a day pass.

A monthly pass for a common passenger is priced at VND 200,000 (USD 8.78).

Network map

See also 

 Transport in Vietnam
 Ho Chi Minh City Metro

References

External links

 
Underground rapid transit in Vietnam
750 V DC railway electrification